Universidad Interamericana (UNICA) is a university in Santo Domingo in the Dominican Republic, which was founded on October 1, 1977.

Universities in the Dominican Republic
Education in Santo Domingo